The 165th (French Acadian) Battalion, CEF was a unit in the Canadian Expeditionary Force during the First World War.  Based in Moncton, New Brunswick, the unit began recruiting in late 1915 throughout the Maritime provinces.  After sailing to England in March 1917, the battalion was absorbed into the 13th Reserve Battalion on April 7, 1917.  The 165th (French Acadian) Battalion, CEF had one Officer Commanding: LCol L. C. D'Aigle.

The 165th Battalion is perpetuated by The North Shore (New Brunswick) Regiment.

See also 
Military history of the Acadians

References

Sources
 Meek, John F. Over the Top! The Canadian Infantry in the First World War. Orangeville, Ont.: The Author, 1971.

Military units and formations of New Brunswick
Battalions of the Canadian Expeditionary Force
Organizations based in Moncton
North Shore (New Brunswick) Regiment